It's Never Enough is the fifth and final studio album by American pop punk band Ace Troubleshooter, recorded once more with Tim Patalan at The Loft.

Track listing
"Ball & Chain"
"Anything"
"Jasmine"
"Make It Right"
"Seaside"
"Turn Round"
"My Defense"
"Helen Burns"
"Tempest"
"Hoping"
"Don't Do It Again"
"So Long"

References 

Ace Troubleshooter albums
2004 albums
Tooth & Nail Records albums